Tunis is an unincorporated community and census-designated place in Burleson County, Texas, United States. It was first listed as a CDP in the 2020 census with a population of 90.

References 

Burleson County, Texas
Census-designated places in Burleson County, Texas
Census-designated places in Texas
19th-century establishments in Texas